Spray drying is a method of forming a dry powder from a liquid or slurry by rapidly drying with a hot gas. This is the preferred method of drying of many thermally-sensitive materials such as foods and pharmaceuticals, or materials which may require extremely consistent, fine particle size. Air is the heated drying medium; however, if the liquid is a flammable solvent such as ethanol or the product is oxygen-sensitive then nitrogen is used.

All spray dryers use some type of atomizer or spray nozzle to disperse the liquid or slurry into a controlled drop size spray. The most common of these are rotary disk and single-fluid high pressure swirl nozzles. Atomizer wheels are known to provide broader particle size distribution, but both methods allow for consistent distribution of particle size. Alternatively, for some applications two-fluid or ultrasonic nozzles are used. Depending on the process requirements, drop sizes from 10 to 500 μm can be achieved with the appropriate choices. The most common applications are in the 100 to 200 μm diameter range. The dry powder is often free-flowing.

The most common type of spray dryers are called single effect. There is a single source of drying air at the top of the chamber (see n°4 on the diagram). In most cases the air is blown in the same direction as the sprayed liquid (co-current). A fine powder is produced, but it can have poor flow and produce much dust. To overcome the dust and poor flow of the powder, a new generation of spray dryers called multiple effect spray dryers have been produced. Instead of drying the liquid in one stage, drying is done through two steps: the first at the top (as per single effect) and the second with an integrated static bed at the bottom of the chamber. The bed provides a humid environment which causes smaller particles to clump, producing more uniform particle sizes, usually within the range of 100 to 300 μm. These powders are free-flowing due to the larger particle size.

The fine powders generated by the first stage drying can be recycled in continuous flow either at the top of the chamber (around the sprayed liquid) or at the bottom, inside the integrated fluidized bed.
The drying of the powder can be finalized on an external vibrating fluidized bed.

The hot drying gas can be passed in as a co-current, same direction as sprayed liquid atomizer, or counter-current, where the hot air flows against the flow from the atomizer.  With co-current flow, particles spend less time in the system and the particle separator (typically a cyclone device).  With counter-current flow, particles spend more time in the system and is usually paired with a fluidized bed system.  Co-current flow generally allows the system to operate more efficiently.

Alternatives to spray dryers are:
Freeze dryer: a more-expensive batch process for products that degrade in spray drying. Dry product is not free-flowing.
Drum dryer: a less-expensive continuous process for low-value products; creates flakes instead of free-flowing powder.
Pulse combustion dryer: A less-expensive continuous process that can handle higher viscosities and solids loading than a spray dryer, and sometimes yields a freeze-dry quality powder that is free-flowing.

Spray dryer

A spray dryer takes a liquid stream and separates the solute or suspension as a solid and the solvent into a vapor. The solid is usually collected in a drum or cyclone. The liquid input stream is sprayed through a nozzle into a hot vapor stream and vaporized. Solids form as moisture quickly leaves the droplets. A nozzle is usually used to make the droplets as small as possible, maximizing heat transfer and the rate of water vaporization. Droplet sizes can range from 20 to 180 μm depending on the nozzle.
There are two main types of nozzles: high pressure single fluid nozzle (50 to 300 bars) and two-fluid nozzles: one fluid is the liquid to dry and the second is compressed gas (generally air at 1 to 7 bars).

Spray dryers can dry a product very quickly compared to other methods of drying. They also turn a solution (or slurry) into a dried powder in a single step, which simplifies the process and improves profit margins.

In pharmaceutical manufacturing, spray drying is employed to manufacture Amorphous Solid Dispersions, by uniformly dispersing Active Pharmaceutical Ingredients into a polymer matrix. This state will put the active compounds (drug) in a higher state of energy which in turn facilitates diffusion of drug spices in patient body.

Micro-encapsulation
Spray drying often is used as an encapsulation technique by the food and other industries. A substance to be encapsulated (the load) and an amphipathic carrier (usually some sort of modified starch) are homogenized as a suspension in water (the slurry). The slurry is then fed into a spray drier, usually a tower heated to temperatures above the boiling point of water.

As the slurry enters the tower, it is atomized. Partly because of the high surface tension of water and partly because of the hydrophobic/hydrophilic interactions between the amphipathic carrier, the water, and the load, the atomized slurry forms micelles. The small size of the drops (averaging 100 micrometers in diameter) results in a relatively large surface area which dries quickly. As the water dries, the carrier forms a hardened shell around the load.

Load loss is usually a function of molecular weight. That is, lighter molecules tend to boil off in larger quantities at the processing temperatures. Loss is minimized industrially by spraying into taller towers. A larger volume of air has a lower average humidity as the process proceeds. By the osmosis principle, water will be encouraged by its difference in fugacities in the vapor and liquid phases to leave the micelles and enter the air. Therefore, the same percentage of water can be dried out of the particles at lower temperatures if larger towers are used. Alternatively, the slurry can be sprayed into a partial vacuum. Since the boiling point of a solvent is the temperature at which the vapor pressure of the solvent is equal to the ambient pressure, reducing pressure in the tower has the effect of lowering the boiling point of the solvent.

The application of the spray drying encapsulation technique is to prepare "dehydrated" powders of substances which do not have any water to dehydrate. For example, instant drink mixes are spray dries of the various chemicals which make up the beverage. The technique was once used to remove water from food products. One example is the preparation of dehydrated milk. Because the milk was not being encapsulated and because spray drying causes thermal degradation, milk dehydration and similar processes have been replaced by other dehydration techniques. Skim milk powders are still widely produced using spray drying technology, typically at high solids concentration for maximum drying efficiency. Thermal degradation of products can be overcome by using lower operating temperatures and larger chamber sizes for increased residence times.

Recent research is now suggesting that the use of spray-drying techniques may be an alternative method for crystallization of amorphous powders during the drying process since the temperature effects on the amorphous powders may be significant depending on drying residence times.

Spray drying applications
Food: milk powder, coffee, tea, eggs, cereal, spices, flavorings, blood, starch and starch derivatives, vitamins, enzymes, stevia, nutracutical, colourings, animal feed, etc.

Pharmaceutical: antibiotics, medical ingredients, additives

Industrial: paint pigments, ceramic materials, catalyst supports, microalgae

References

Bibliography

Further reading
Keey, R.B., (1992). Drying of Loose and Particulate Materials 1st ed., Taylor & Francis, 
Nutritional evaluation of food processing second edition (1975), Robert S. Harris, Ph.D. and Endel Karmas Ph.D. (eds)
Cook, E.M, and DuMont, H.D. (1991) Process Drying Practice, McGraw-Hill, Inc.,

External links
Animation of standard Spray Drying Concept
Spray Drying trainings paper

Food industry
Flavor technology
Drying processes
Industrial processes
Pharmaceutical industry